Piedrabuenia is a monospecific genus of marine ray-finned fish belonging to the family Zoarcidae, the eelpouts. Its only species is Piedrabuenia ringueleti which is found in the southwestern Atlantic Ocean off Argentina.

References

Lycodinae
Fish described in 1971
Monotypic ray-finned fish genera